Nebria dejeanii is a species of ground beetle in the Nebriinae subfamily that is endemic to Austria.

References

External links
Nebria dejeanii at Fauna Europaea

dejeanii
Beetles described in 1826
Beetles of Europe
Endemic fauna of Austria